Alexander Mair Courage Jr. (December 10, 1919May 15, 2008) familiarly known as "Sandy" Courage, was an American orchestrator, arranger, and composer of music, primarily for television and film. He is best known as the composer of the theme music for the original Star Trek series.

Early life
Courage was born in Philadelphia, Pennsylvania. He received a music degree from the Eastman School of Music in Rochester, New York, in 1941. He served in the United States Army Air Forces in the western United States during the Second World War. During that period, he also found the time to compose music for the radio. His credits in this medium include the programs Adventures of Sam Spade Detective, Broadway Is My Beat, Hollywood Soundstage, and Romance.

Career
Courage began as an orchestrator and arranger at MGM studios, which included work in such films as the 1951 Show Boat ("Life Upon the Wicked Stage" number); Hot Rod Rumble (1957 film); The Band Wagon ("I Guess I'll Have to Change My Plan"); Gigi (the can-can for the entrance of patrons at Maxim's); and the barn raising dance from Seven Brides for Seven Brothers.

He frequently served as an orchestrator on films scored by André Previn (My Fair Lady, "The Circus is a Wacky World", and "You're Gonna Hear from Me" production numbers for Inside Daisy Clover), Adolph Deutsch (Funny Face, Some Like It Hot), John Williams (The Poseidon Adventure, Superman, Jurassic Park, and the Academy Award-nominated musical films Fiddler on the Roof and Tom Sawyer), and Jerry Goldsmith (Rudy, Mulan, The Mummy, et al.).  He also arranged the Leslie Bricusse score (along with Lionel Newman) for Doctor Dolittle (1967).

Apart from his work as a respected orchestrator, Courage also contributed original dramatic scores to films, including two westerns: Arthur Penn's The Left Handed Gun (1958) and André de Toth's Day of the Outlaw (1959), and the Connie Francis comedy Follow the Boys (1963). He continued writing music for movies throughout the 1980s and 1990s, including the score for Superman IV: The Quest for Peace (1987), which incorporated three new musical themes by John Williams in addition to Courage's adapted and original cues for the film. Courage's score for Superman IV: The Quest for Peace was released on CD in early 2008 by the Film Music Monthly company as part of its boxed set Superman - The Music, while La-La Land Records released a fully expanded restoration of the score on May 8, 2018, as part of Superman's 80th anniversary.

Courage also worked as a composer on such television shows as Daniel Boone, The Brothers Brannagan, Lost in Space, Eight Is Enough, and Voyage to the Bottom of the Sea. Judd, for the Defense, Young Dr. Kildare and The Brothers Brannagan were the only television series besides Star Trek for which he composed the main theme.

The composer Jerry Goldsmith and Courage teamed on the long-running television show The Waltons in which Goldsmith composed the theme and Courage the Aaron Copland-influenced incidental music. In 1988, Courage won an Emmy Award for his music direction on the special Julie Andrews: The Sound of Christmas.  In the 1990s, Courage succeeded Arthur Morton as Goldsmith's primary orchestrator.

Courage and Goldsmith collaborated again on orchestrations for Goldsmith's score for the 1997 film "The Edge."

Courage frequently collaborated with John Williams during the latter's tenure with the Boston Pops Orchestra.

Family 
At the age of 35, Courage married Mareile Beate Odlum on October 6, 1955.

Mareile, born in Germany, was the daughter of Rudolf Wolff and Elisabeth Loechelt. After Wolff's suicide Elisabeth married Carl Wilhelm Richard Hülsenbeck, renowned for his involvement in the Dada movement in Europe. Hülsenbeck brought his wife (Elisabeth), son (Tom) and step-daughter (Mareile) to the United States in 1938 to avoid the political situation rapidly developing in Europe. After arriving in the USA he changed his last name to Hulbeck.

Mareile's marriage to Courage was her third. Her second marriage was to Bruce Odlum (son of financier Floyd Odlum) in 1944. That union produced two sons, Christopher (1947) and Brian (1949).

When Courage married Mareile he accepted the responsibility of acting stepfather to Mareile's two children of a previous marriage. The family originally lived together on Erskine Dr. in Pacific Palisades, but later moved to a mountainside home on Beverly Crest Drive in Beverly Hills.

Aside from his musical abilities Courage was also an avid and accomplished photographer. He took many dramatic photos of bullfights and auto racing. He was a racing enthusiast, and his interest in that sport and photography brought him into contact with many racing personalities of the era, notably Phil Hill and Stirling Moss, both of whom he considered friends. Moss paid at least one social visit to the Erskine residence.

Though a dedicated stepfather to Christopher and Brian, Courage's musical career took precedence over his familial responsibilities. He sought to interest his step-children in music, and was responsible for arranging Brian's first musical lessons, on alto saxophone. Later in life Brian became a composer of serious electronic music, though the vocation was not apparent during his childhood, as he was a poor saxophone student.

Alexander and Mareile were divorced April 1, 1963. Courage subsequently married Kristin M. Zethren on July 14, 1967. That marriage also ended in divorce in 1972.

Star Trek theme 
Courage is best known for writing the theme music for the original Star Trek series, and other music for that series. Courage was hired by Star Trek creator Gene Roddenberry to score the original series at Jerry Goldsmith's suggestion, after Goldsmith turned down the job.  

Courage went on to score incidental music for episodes "The Man Trap" and "The Naked Time" and some cues for "Mudd's Women."
Courage reportedly became alienated from Roddenberry when Roddenberry claimed half of the theme music royalties. Roddenberry wrote words for Courage's theme, not because he expected the lyrics to be sung on television, but so that he (Roddenberry) could receive half of the royalties from the song by claiming credit as the composition's co-writer. Courage was replaced by composer Fred Steiner who was then hired to write the musical scores for the remainder of the first season. 

After sound editors had difficulty finding the right effect, Courage himself made the iconic "whoosh" sound heard while the Enterprise flies across the screen, 

He returned to Star Trek to score two more episodes for the show's third and final season, episodes "The Enterprise Incident" and "Plato's Stepchildren," allegedly as a courtesy to Producer Robert Justman.

Notably, after later serving as Goldsmith's orchestrator, when Goldsmith composed the music for Star Trek: The Motion Picture,  Courage orchestrated Goldsmith's adaptation of his original Star Trek theme.

Following Star Trek: The Motion Picture, Courage's iconic opening fanfare to the Star Trek theme became one of the franchise's most famous and memorable musical cues. The fanfare has been used in multiple motion pictures and television series,  notably Star Trek: The Next Generation and the four feature films based upon that series, three of which were scored by Goldsmith.

Death
Courage had been in declining health for several years before he died on May 15, 2008, at the Sunrise assisted-living facility in Pacific Palisades, California. He had suffered a series of strokes prior to his death. His mausoleum is in Westwood Village Memorial Park Cemetery.

References

External links
 
 
 
 
 Alexander Courage Collection at Sibley Music Library, Eastman School of Music
 

1919 births
2008 deaths
20th-century American composers
20th-century American male musicians
American film score composers
American male film score composers
American music arrangers
American television composers
Burials at Westwood Village Memorial Park Cemetery
Fresh Sounds Records artists
Eastman School of Music alumni
Emmy Award winners
La-La Land Records artists
Male television composers
Music based on Star Trek
Musicians from Philadelphia
United States Army Air Forces soldiers